Suryapet is a city in the Indian state of Telangana. It is a municipality and the headquarters of its eponymous district. The Government of India announced Suryapet to be developed under the Atal Mission for Rejuvenation and Urban Transformation (AMRUT) scheme. Suryapet has been awarded the "Cleanest city" in South India by the Ministry of Urban development in Swachh Survekshan 2017. It is also known as "Gateway of Telangana".

Etymology 
Previously Suryapet is known as Bhanupuri, which is modernized into the name Suryapet. People also call the town as Suryapeta.

Geography 

History 

Chalukyas, Kakatiyas, and Nizam dynasties ruled this region.

Climate 
Under the Köppen climate classification, Suryapet experiences Tropical Wet and Dry Climate. The annual mean temperature is 36 °C. Monthly mean temperatures are 19–40 °C (66–104 °F). Summers (March–June) are hot and humid, with temperatures in the low 30s Celsius; during dry spells, maximum temperatures often exceed 45 °C in May and June. Winter lasts for only about  months, with seasonal lows dipping to 9–11 °C (48–52 °F) in December and January. May is the hottest month, with daily temperatures ranging from 35–43 °C (95–109 °F); January, the coldest month, has temperatures varying from 15–23 °C (59–73 °F). The highest recorded temperature is 51.02 °C (111.0 °F), and the lowest is 9 °C (48 °F).

Rains brought by the south-west summer monsoon lash Suryapet between June and September, supplying it with most of its annual rainfall of 821.0 mm. The highest total monthly rainfall, 180.0 mm, occurs in July. There is also significant rainfall in October and November from northeast monsoons. Winter season starts in December and lasts through February. Temperatures range from a minimum of 18 °C and can reach 33 °C.

Demographics 

 India census, Suryapet had an urban metropolitan population of 115,250 Suryapet is the most populous city in Suryapet district. Apart from the city population, it has a floating population of approximately 10,000 from the neighbouring villages daily. Males constitute 52% of the population and females 48%. Suryapet has an average literacy rate of 84.88%, higher than the national average of 74.04.%: male literacy is 91.18%, and female literacy is 78.74%. In Suryapet, 11% of the population is under 6 years of age.

Governance

Civic administration 

Suryapet municipality was constituted in 1952. It was upgraded to Grade–II in 1984, Grade–I on 7 November 1998. The present municipal commissioner is V. Surender and the chairman is Perumalla Annapurna.

The city also serves as the headquarters of Suryapet mandal in the Suryapet revenue division.

Awards 
Suryapet Municipality became the first waste-compliant city of India in 2003. It had won Green Leaf Award for Best Garbage Disposal in 2007.
Suryapet is the first municipality in the country to receive the (ISO 14001-2004 certificate.
Suryapet Municipality has won the HUDCO Award under environmental 
management category.

Education 
The primary and secondary school education is imparted by government, aided and private schools, under the School Education Department of the state.

The medium of instruction followed by schools are English, Telugu and Urdu.

Government Medical College at Suryapet, a first after the formation of new districts in the State

Swaminarayan Gurukul International School, 48th branch is in Suryapet

National Highways 
NH 65-Pune-Solapur-Hyderabad-Suryapet-Vijayawada 
NH 365B-Suryapet-Jangaon-Siddipet-Siricilla $Connecting different district Hq's of the state
NH 365BB-Suryapet-Khammam-Rajahmundry

Transport

Road 
Suryapet Hi-tech Bus station is the fifth largest bus station in Telangana after Hyderabad, Khammam, Karimnagar and Nizamabad bus stations.

There are three bus stations in Suryapet.
 High-Tech Bus station
 New bus station
 Old bus station

Air 

Rajiv Gandhi International Airport in Hyderabad is the nearest airport at a distance of 135 km by road. The other airport nearer to Suryapet is Vijayawada International Airport which is at a distance of 160 km by road.

See also 
 Suryapet (Assembly constituency)
List of cities in Telangana by area
List of cities in Telangana by population
List of Smart and Amrut Cities in Telangana

List of cities in India by area

References

External links 

Cities in Telangana
Mandal headquarters in Suryapet district